Center for Snow and Avalanche Study Establishment (SASE) is a laboratory of the Defence Research & Development Organization (DRDO). Located near Manali, Himachal Pradesh its primary function is research in the field of snow and avalanches to provide avalanche control measures and forecasting support to Indian Armed Forces. In 2020, Defence Terrain Research Laboratory (DTRL) was merged with Snow and Avalanche Studies Establishment which is renamed into Defence Geoinformatics Research Establishment (DGRE).

See also 
 List of DRDO laboratories
 Aeronautical Development Agency
 Bharat Electronics Limited
 Defence Institute of Advanced Technology
 Hindustan Aeronautics Limited
 Ordnance Factories Board

References

External links
 Snow and Avalanche Study Establishment

Defence Research and Development Organisation laboratories
Research institutes in Chandigarh
Research and development in India
Snow
Research institutes established in 1969
1969 establishments in Himachal Pradesh